The Kintrishi National Park is a protected landscape in Kobuleti Municipality, Adjara, Western Georgia, located at the gorge of the Kintrishi River and was established in 2007.

Kintrishi Protected Areas include Kintrishi National Park and Kintrishi Strict Nature Reserve which was first established in 1959.

The Kintrishi Protected Areas were established to preserve unique flora and fauna and famous Colchian willow trees. Archeological excavations revealed pre-Christian monuments in this areas.

See also 
 Kintrishi Strict Nature Reserve
 Mtirala National Park
 Euxine-Colchic deciduous forests

References 

National parks of Georgia (country)
Protected areas established in 2007
Geography of Adjara
Tourist attractions in Adjara